Toller was a railway station on the Bridport Railway in the west of the English county of Dorset. The station served the village of Toller Porcorum. Opened on 31 March 1862, five years after the branch, it consisted of a single platform and a modest wooden building.

History

Opened by the Bridport Railway, but operated from the outset by the Great Western Railway, it was placed in the Western Region when the railways were nationalised in 1948.

The branch was threatened with closure in the Beeching report, but narrow roads in the area, unsuitable for buses, kept it open until 5 May 1975. In its final years, trains were normally formed of a single-carriage Class 121 diesel railcar.

The site today

The platform can still be seen from the overbridge although the building was moved to Totnes on the South Devon Railway, a heritage line.

References

Further reading

External links
 Station on navigable O.S. map

 Bridport Trailway
 Toller on disused-stations.org.uk

Disused railway stations in Dorset
Former Great Western Railway stations
Railway stations in Great Britain opened in 1862
Railway stations in Great Britain closed in 1975
1862 establishments in England
Beeching closures in England